Hieracium insolitum is a species of plant endemic to Turkey.

References

insolitum
Plants described in 2013